The 2010 Conference Premier play-off Final, known as the 2010 Blue Square Premier play-off Final for sponsorship purposes, was a football match between Oxford United and York City on 16 May 2010 at Wembley Stadium in London. It was the eighth Conference Premier play-off Final and the fourth to be played at Wembley Stadium. The 2010 Final set a new Conference Premier play-off Final attendance record of 42,669 (158 more than the existing record set by Cambridge United and Exeter City two seasons before) with ticket sales suggesting Oxford brought over 33,000 of these.

Oxford won the match 3–1 to secure promotion to League Two, thus returning to the Football League after a four-year absence.

Match

Details

References

play-off Final 2010
2010
Play-off Final 2010
Play-off Final 2010
Conference Premier play-off Final
National League play-off final
Events at Wembley Stadium